Firaz is a surname. Notable people with the surname include:

Bill Fivaz (born 1934), American numismatist and author
Henri Fivaz, Swiss sailor and Olumpian
Julien Fivaz (born 1979), Swiss long jumper